The Last Sessions is a two-volume album by Sonny Stitt. Recorded six weeks before he died, this was his last full album.

References

1984 albums
Sonny Stitt albums